The Mount Buffalo Chalet is an accommodation resort in the Mount Buffalo National Park, the Park administered by Parks Victoria. It is the largest timber building in Australia.

History
The Mount Buffalo Chalet was built in 1910 by the Public Works Department as the first ski resort in the Victorian Alps. It was leased to private enterprise as a guest house. In October 1924 it was taken over by the Victorian Railways who offered holiday packages, with train services from Melbourne connecting with Hoys Roadlines services at Porepunkah railway station.

In December 1985 it passed to the Victorian Tourism Commission. After being leased privately in 1993, it closed in January 2007. It is the largest timber building in Australia.

References

External links

Buildings and structures completed in 1910
Ski areas and resorts in Victoria (Australia)
Victorian Alps
1910 establishments in Australia
Victorian Heritage Register
Victorian Heritage Register Hume (region)
Alpine Shire